Jefferson Charles de Souza Pinto, known as Jefferson (born March 28, 1982), is a Brazilian football player who last played for Gold Coast United.

Club career
On December 15, 2008, Jefferson was signed to a one-year deal by A-League club, Gold Coast United. He was released after one appearance due to injuries, to be replaced by fellow Brazilian Anderson.

References

External links
 Gold Coast United profile

Living people
Brazilian footballers
Brazilian expatriate footballers
Criciúma Esporte Clube players
Olaria Atlético Clube players
Gold Coast United FC players
A-League Men players
1982 births
Association football midfielders
Footballers from Rio de Janeiro (city)